is a former Japanese football player.

Club statistics

References

External links

1984 births
Living people
Association football people from Ōita Prefecture
Japanese footballers
J1 League players
J2 League players
Oita Trinita players
Mito HollyHock players
Association football defenders